Stephen John Parker AO is a legal academic and university administrator who became Vice-Chancellor of the University of Canberra in 2007.

Education
Parker was born in the north of England. He graduated from the University of Newcastle-upon-Tyne with a Bachelor of Laws. He went on to obtain a PhD from the University of Wales.

Law
He practised law in the UK before moving to Australia in 1988.

Professor Parker is a Barrister and Solicitor of the Supreme Court of the Australian Capital Territory, Barrister-at-Law of the Supreme Court of Queensland and Solicitor of the Supreme Court of England and Wales.

Academic life
He first worked as an academic at University College, Cardiff. 

Between 1988 and 1994, he was Senior Lecturer and Reader in law at the Australian National University. He was then Professor of Law at Griffith University.

In 1999, he was appointed Dean of Monash University Law School, a position he held until 2003. He then became Deputy Vice-Chancellor of Monash University.

He became Vice-Chancellor of the University of Canberra in 2007. In September 2015, Parker announced that he would retire from the University of Canberra in July 2016, having served nine years (two terms) in the position.

References

Academic staff of the University of Canberra
British expatriate academics
British legal scholars
Year of birth missing (living people)
Living people
Officers of the Order of Australia
Alumni of Newcastle University
Alumni of the University of Wales
Academic staff of Monash University
Australian barristers
British barristers
Academics of Cardiff University
Academic staff of the Australian National University
Academic staff of Griffith University